Novaya Olshanka is a rural locality (a selo) and the administrative center of Novoolshanskoye Rural Settlement, Nizhnedevitsky District, Voronezh Oblast, Russia. The population was 514 as of 2010. There are 15 streets.

Geography 
Novaya Olshanka is located 19 km north of Nizhnedevitsk (the district's administrative centre) by road. Nizhnedevitsk is the nearest rural locality.

References 

Rural localities in Nizhnedevitsky District